Star Soldier R is a futuristic scrolling shooter video game developed by Hudson Soft, and is the seventh installment in the Star Soldier series. The game features classic Star Soldier gameplay combined with 3D graphics.

Star Soldier R is one of several video games released exclusively as WiiWare through the Wii Shop Channel. It was released with the Japanese launch of WiiWare on March 25, 2008, in North America on May 19, 2008, and in Europe on May 20, 2008 with the European launch of WiiWare.

Gameplay

Star Soldier R retains classic gameplay features from the Star Soldier series, such as the vertical-scrolling shooter style, three adjustable speeds for the player's ship, and score bonuses once the player has achieved a score of 50,000 and 80,000 points.

Instead of a traditional progressive level structure, the game revolves around time attack-style gameplay, called Caravan mode, with players aiming to score as many points as possible in either two- or five-minute game modes in one of the game's levels. Unlike previous installments in the series, however, there are only two playable levels. Aside from regular scrolling-shooter gameplay, the game also has a Fast Shot mode which measures how quickly the player can press the fire button.

Power-ups
The game has two types of primary power-ups, in the form of red and blue capsules. Red power-up capsules enhance the offensive ability of the player's ship, eventually resulting in a five-way shot. Blue power-ups enhance the ship's "Force," a shield that protects the ship from enemy attacks and can be separated from the ship to attack enemies.

Plot
In 2180, the Joint Forces of Earth come under attack from the mysterious Brain Forces. After an initial victory by the J.F.E., the Core Brain, the central unit of the Brain Forces, begins closing in from light years away. The player takes control of the prototype starfighter Caesar, built specially to counter the threat of the Brain Forces, and must defeat the Core Brain and save humanity.

Trivia
If the player presses the A button during the Credits, then they can take control of the craft from the first Star Soldier game.

Reception

Star Soldier R received mixed reviews. IGN lauded the quality of the game's core design and top-down shooter gameplay, but criticized the time limitations and repetition with the levels as "thin and ultimately cheap for most gamers." 1UP.com praised the game as "fun and addictive," but noted that the price of 800 Wii points may be somewhat high for the casual gamer to accept. GameSpot also criticized the game for being too short, but described the gameplay as addictive and supported by an excellent control scheme. Eurogamer noted the game as targeting a narrow niche among gamers, saying that the game was more oriented to high-score seekers than a casual audience.

See also
List of WiiWare games
Star Soldier (series)

References

External links
Star Soldier R Official Websites: Japan, Americas, Europe, Australia
Star Soldier R at IGN

2008 video games
Star Soldier
Video games developed in Japan
WiiWare games
Wii-only games
Wii Wi-Fi games